Bashir "Hojjat" Nazari is an Iranian reformist politician who is a member of the City Council of Tehran.

His father Hojjat Nazari, was a military commander killed in the Iran–Iraq War.

References

Living people
National Trust Party (Iran) politicians
Tehran Councillors 2017–
1988 births